Nøgne Ø is a Norwegian brewery founded in January 2002 by Gunnar Wiig and Kjetil Jikiun. The name is Danish for "Naked Isle" and was selected from the 19th-century Norwegian poem Terje Vigen by Henrik Ibsen. In most years since 2006, the brewery has been on RateBeer's list of top 100 breweries in the world.

History 
The brewery has grown from a 300 hl production in 2003 to an estimated 20000 hl production in 2015. They make more than 30 different styles of ales, and have an export to more than 40 markets. On November 25, 2013 Hansa Borg Bryggerier acquired a majority share in Nøgne Ø.  This enabled them to export their beer to more countries.

Kjetil Jikiun left the brewery in July 2015. They moved to a new brewing facilities next to their old brewery in Grimstad in June 2017.

Beers

Core range 
 #100 - Hopped Barley Wine - 10% ABV 
 #500 - Imperial India Pale Ale - 10% ABV
 4885 - Blanc - 4,5% ABV
 Southern IPA - NORWIPA - 4,5% ABV
 Asian Pale Ale - Lemongrass Infused Ale - 4,5 % ABV
 Blonde - Belgian Blonde Ale - 4,5 % ABV
 Brown Ale - Traditional British Ale - 4,5 % ABV 
 Global Pale Ale - Hoppy Pale Ale - 4,5 % ABV
 Imperial Stout - Strong Dark Ale - 9% ABV
 Imperial Brown Ale - Double Brown Ale - 7,5 % ABV
 India Pale Ale - American IPA - 7,5 % ABV
 Porter - Robust Porter - 7% ABV 
 Saison - Belgian Style Saison - 6,5 % ABV
 Tiger Triple - Belgian Style Triple - 9% ABV
 Two Captains - Double IPA - 8,5 % ABV
 Wit - Belgian Spiced Ale - 4,5 % ABV

Seasonal Beers 
 God Jul
 Julequad
 Hvit Jul
 Ekstra God Jul
 Grønn Jul
 Rød Jul
 Gul Jul

Retired Beers 
 Dark Horizon 1st edition (launched 2007) - Retired
 Dark Horizon 2nd edition (launched 2008) - Retired
 Dark Horizon 3rd edition (launched 2010) - Retired
 Dark Horizon 4th edition (launched 2013) - Retired
 Dark Horizon 5th edition (launched 2017) - Retired
 Red Horizon 1st edition (launched 2010) - Retired
 Red Horizon 2nd edition (launched 2013) - Retired
 Red Horizon 3rd edition (launched 2013) - Retired
 Sweet Horizon edition (launched 2010) - Retired
 Special Holiday Ale (2009) - Retired
 Julesnadder - Retired
 Julequad 2016 - Retired
 Julequad 2017 - Retired
 Winter Ale (God Jul)  - Retired
 Julenatt (2004–2006)  - Retired 
 Peculiar Yule (Underlig Jul) - Retired
 God Påske - Retired
 Trippel (2003–2004) - Retired
 Weiss (2003) - Retired
 Beyond the Pale Ale (2006) - Retired
 Kos på Groos (2008) - Retired
 Le Vanilla Framboise Porter - Retired
 Tangerine Dream (2008) - Retired
 Tyttebær - Retired
 Ut På Tur (2008) - Retired
 Weiss (2003) - Retired

Other information 
 Nøgne Ø also produced sake, as the first sake brewery in Europe. Sake production was stopped in March 2018.
 Nøgne Ø imports Weihenstephaner to Norway.

References

External links
Nøgne Ø official website 
RateBeer brewer listing

Grimstad
Breweries in Norway
Companies established in 2002
Companies based in Agder
2002 establishments in Norway